DiMAGE A2 is a digital camera which was manufactured by Konica Minolta, announced on February 12, 2004.

Specifications
The Konica Minolta DiMAGE A2 is a discontinued,  8 megapixel CCD digital camera. Sony bought out the Konica Minolta line and from that came the new Sony line called the Sony Alpha series. The A2's features include  a manual focus ring, time lapse options, a 922,000 pixel viewfinder, and an articulating rear 1.8 inch screen and a 7× zoom barrel. The camera was produced with a fixed lens and electronic viewfinder.

References

External links
 Steves Digicams - A2 Review
 DPPreview.com A2 Review
 DC Resource - A2 Review

A2
Cameras introduced in 2004